Qunnie Pettway (1943–2010) was an American artist. She worked for the Freedom Quilting Bee and is associated with the Gee's Bend group of quilters. Her mother, Candis Pettway, taught her to quilt, and she passed the skill on to her daughter Loretta Pettway Bennett. She specialized in making traditional quilt patterns out of scraps she brought home from the Bee.

Life 
Qunnie was surrounded by dedicated quilt-makers her entire life. Her mother, Candis Pettway, and her sister were her first mentors. Later she learned classic patterns while at Estelle Witherspoon's house, where upwards of 20 women would quilt together.

She later developed diabetes, and when she began to lose her eye sight, she only made quilts from simple patterns. She died in 2010.

Work 
Recognized for her innovation, Qunnie's style is marked by her improvisational versions of traditional patterns. Her favorite method was the "Crazy Z" quilt composed of corduroy from the Freedom Quilting Bee.

References 

1943 births
2010 deaths
American quilters